This is a timeline of the history of tennis on television in the UK.

1930s to 1950s 

 1937
 21 June – The BBC broadcasts television coverage of the Wimbledon Tennis Championships for the first time.

 1956
 Following its launch the previous autumn, ITV broadcasts coverage from Wimbledon Championships for the first time.

1960s 

 1960
 No events.

 1961
 No events.

 1962
 No events.

 1963
 No events.

 1964
 23 June – Wimbledon: Match of the Day is broadcast for the first time, featuring "recorded highlights of today's outstanding match."

 1965
 No events.

 1966
 No events.

 1967
 1 July – Wimbledon becomes the first programme to be broadcast in colour. The colour coverage is restricted to BBC2 as it is a further two years before colour broadcasts begin on BBC1.

 1968
 24 June-6 July – The Wimbledon Championships are shown on ITV for the final time.

 1969
  23 June – The BBC once again becomes the exclusive broadcaster of the Wimbledon Championships.

1970s 
 1970 to 1976
 No events.

 1977
 The BBC broadcasts the US Open for the first time but coverage is restricted to next day highlights of the men's final. It also does the same in 1978.

 1978
 No events.

 1979
 14 June – The BBC shows live coverage of the Queen's Club Championships for the first time, and more than 40 years on, the BBC continues to provide extensive live coverage of the event.

1980s 
 1980
 No events.

 1981
 7 June – The BBC broadcasts coverage of the French Open for the first time. Coverage is restricted to finals weekend.

 1982
 No events.

 1983
 No events.

 1984
 25 June – Wimbledon: Match of the Day is broadcast on BBC1 for the first time.
 1 September – The BBC expands its coverage of the US Open when it shows highlights of play throughout the second week.

 1985
 No events.

 1986
 No events.

 1987
 14 September – The BBC shows the US Open for the final time, having shown live coverage of the finals of the event for the past five years although it does show the event once more, in 1992.

 1988
 10 September – Channel Four broadcasts the 1988 US Open.

 1989
 January – The BBC televises the Australian Open for the first time. However this is a one-off and does not cover the event again until 1995.
 5 February – Eurosport begins broadcasting and tennis is the first event to be shown on the channel, when it shows Davis Cup action. Tennis goes on to receive extensive coverage on the channel and to this day Eurosport is the principal broadcaster of the Australian Open and the French Open.

1990s 
 1990
 25 June– 
 Wimbledon: Match of the Day is renamed Today at Wimbledon and for the first time, the programme receives a next morning repeat on BBC2.
 In addition to the BBC's extensive live coverage, British Satellite Broadcasting broadcasts nightly highlights of the 1990 Wimbledon Championships.
 27 August-9 September – BSB broadcasts daily live coverage of the US Open. This is the first time that the UK has received daily live coverage of this event.

 1991
 Sky Sports broadcasts nightly highlights of Wimbledon. This is the only time that the tournament has been broadcast on Sky Sports.
 26 August – Sky Sports begins its coverage of the US Open tournament. This is the first major tennis event that Sky covers and the channel shows live coverage of the entire tournament.

 1992
 No events.

 1993
 The BBC extends its daily live coverage of Wimbledon with coverage running until 8.30pm each night.

 1994
 No events.

 1995
 June – The BBC expands its coverage of the French Open when, for the first time, it shows live coverage of the second week. Previously, the BBC's coverage of the event had been finals weekend and occasional coverage of the semi-finals during cricket rain delays.
 9 July – For the first time, the BBC shows live coverage of the men's singles final on BBC1. Previously, it had been shown on BBC2 as part of Sunday Grandstand.

 1996
 No events.

 1997
 Today at Wimbledon moves back to BBC2 and for the first time the highlights programme is given a fixed weekday slot of 9.30pm.

 1998
 No events.

 1999
 2 April – Following Britain's elevation to the World Group of the Davis Cup, the BBC starts showing full live coverage of Britain's matches in the tournament. Previously, the BBC had only shown Britain's ties as brief highlights, and on an ad-hoc basis.
 The launch the previous year of BBC Choice allows the BBC to provide coverage of an alternative match at Wimbledon beyond just after 4pm for the first time.

2000s 
 2000
 ONdigital purchases the rights to the ATP Masters Series and shows live coverage on its ONsport channel.

 2001
 11 August – The ITV Sport Channel replaces ONsport and coverage of the ATP Masters Series moves to the new channel.

 2002
 Following the demise of the ITV Sport Channel, coverage of the ATP Masters Series moves to Sky Sports.

 2003
 No events.

 2004
 No events.

 2005
 Today at Wimbledon is moved to the earlier start time of 8.30pm with live coverage transferred to the BBC Red Button at this point.

 2006
 Today at Wimbledon is moved to the earlier start time of 8pm. Consequently, the programme is not broadcast if major matches are still in progress and on other days, live tennis transfers at 8pm to the BBC Red Button.

 2007
 High-definition television coverage of Wimbledon is broadcast by the BBC for the first time. The BBC HD channel shows continual live coverage during the tournament of Centre Court and Court No. 1 as well as the evening highlights show Today at Wimbledon.

 2008
 No events.

 2009
 December  – The BBC broadcasts the end of year ATP Finals for the first time.

2010s
2010
 No events.

2011
 No events.

2012
 27 May – ITV Sport takes over as terrestrial broadcaster of the French Open. ITV shows full live coverage, mainly on ITV4, as opposed to the partial coverage shown by the previous rights holder, the BBC. This is the first time since 1968 that ITV has shown coverage of one of the sport's big four tournaments.

2013
 No events.

2014
 January – BT Sport replaces Sky Sports as broadcaster of the Women's Tennis Association.
 June – BT Sport broadcasts men's tennis for the first time when it shows live coverage of the AEGON Championships tennis tournament from Queen's Club.

2015
 June – The BBC's Wimbledon Tennis Championships highlights programme changes format and name, to Wimbledon 2day, with a new lighthearted magazine format, but after only one year, the format was abandoned for 2016. 
September – Sky Sports shows coverage of the US Open for the final time, having shown the event every years since 1991. It had decided not to bid for the rights to the 2016 tournament.

2016
 27 June – Eurosport shows live and recorded coverage of the Wimbledon Tennis Championships for the first time, thereby becoming the first commercial pay-TV broadcaster to air live UK coverage from the All England Club. Its live coverage is restricted to the finals weekend. This is the first time since 1968 that the BBC has not been the exclusive broadcaster of Wimbledon in the UK.

2017
 May – Dave replaces Sky Sports as broadcaster of tennis' Tie Break Tens tournament.
 28 August-10 September –  Eurosport shows the US Open for the final time. It had held exclusive rights to the past two tournaments and prior to this it had obtained secondary rights to the event with Sky Sports being the main rights holder.

2018
 18 June – Amazon Prime's first live sport in the UK is the Queen's Club tennis tournament.
 27 August – Amazon Prime broadcasts the US Open for the first time. This is the first time that a major sporting event has only been available via a streaming-only platform.
 December – Sky Sports’ coverage of tennis ends after it loses the rights to the ATP Tour to Amazon Prime.

2019
3 November – BT Sport ends its coverage of the WTA after it loses the rights to Amazon Prime.
 November – The BBC loses the rights to Britain's Davis Cup tennis matches to Eurosport, having held them since the late 1990s.

2020s
 2020
 6 January – Amazon Prime Video expands its coverage of tennis when it takes over as the UK broadcaster of the WTA, showing 49 tournaments a year.

 2021
 13 June – ITV broadcasts the French Open for the final time following Eurosport gaining exclusive rights to the event from 2022 onwards.
 11 September – Channel 4 does a last-minute deal with rights-holder Amazon Prime to show live coverage of the final of the 2021 US Open – Women's Singles after Britain’s Emma Raducanu reaches the final. This is the first time since the late 1980s that tennis has been shown on Channel 4.
 24–26 September – Eurosport becomes the exclusive broadcast of the Laver Cup, and will show the event until 2030.

 2022
 June – For the first time, there is no free-to-air coverage of the French Open as all live and recorded coverage is shown on Eurosport.
 27 June – For the first time since 1983, the BBC schedules live evening coverage of Wimbledon on BBC One to try to reduce the disruption caused to the BBC's schedules due to last moment decisions to transfer live coverage from BBC Two to BBC One.

 2023
 28 August – The US Open returns to Sky Sports.

References

tennis on UK television
tennis on UK television
tennis on UK television
Sports television in the United Kingdom
tennis on UK television
tennis on UK television